Daniel G. Guttfreund, Ph.D., (born March 23, 1962) is a Salvadoran psychologist.

Biography

Born on March 23, 1962 in San Salvador, El Salvador, Daniel Guttfreund is the son of Enrique and Gertrude Guttfreund, who escaped World War II, and became well known entrepreneurs in El Salvador. His father later became ambassador of El Salvador in Israel. 

Guttfreund is the youngest of five siblings. He grew up in El Salvador, attending Escuela Americana - the American School of El Salvador - from which he graduated in 1979. He spent his younger years in Jerusalem, Israel, beginning his studies in sociology and social anthropology at the Hebrew University of Jerusalem. After graduating, he moved to California, U.S.A, and continued his education at the California School of Professional Psychology in San Diego, where he met his wife, Dr. Lisa Guttfreund. Both obtained their doctorate in clinical psychology in 1988 and married that year in October.

The Guttfreunds have lived in California, Jerusalem, and El Salvador. They have three daughters.

Career
Due to the war in El Salvador, Guttfreund moved to Israel to start his studies at the Hebrew University of Jerusalem. In 1982, he was included in the dean's list of Hebrew University and later on in 1989, he was selected by the students as one of the "Exceptional Speakers" during the fall semester. While studying for his B.A., he was the head of Jewish Young Adult Movement to try to promote communication, he also worked at the Alyn Hospital for the physically challenged.  

Guttfreund moved to California to pursue his doctoral studies. In 1986, he was selected to be part of "Who's who of American Colleges and Universities" and in 1988 he was recognized with honors for his doctorate thesis defense. 

While living in Israel, Guttfreund, worked at the Hebrew University Counseling Center and also was an adjunct professor at the Hebrew University. Also, while living in Israel, he developed a board game conceived as a fun and interactive method of communication for both families and mental health professionals. The game is called Yad al Ha Lev and was later sold to Orda Ltd.

While in El Salvador, Guttfreund developed a second game, called Diverti, with its proceeds going to the "Tin Marín" children's museum of El Salvador, which was created and founded by Guttfreund. Guttfreund has also brought speakers to El Salvador, such as Dr. Edward Hallowell and Dr. Eric Storch.

Guttfreund was a founding member of the first children's museum in El Salvador,  the "Tin Marín" children's museum, which has operated for 17 years, receiving roughly 180,000 visitors a year, making it the most visited educational institution in El Salvador.  Guttfreund still serves on the board of directors, and he focuses mainly on directing an educational axis around prevention and social impact of the museum exhibits. The Tin Marín museum is the first ever in El Salvador to hold an exhibit focused on the topic of sexual abuse.

Guttfreund facilitated a donation of USD $250,000 to make the Tin Marín museum fully solar powered. This will make it the first fully solar powered children's museum, the first fully solar powered educational facility as well as the first fully solar powered building in the country. This project was done with help of USAID and salvadoran bank Banco Agrícola.

He has worked closely with the Peace Corps and the United States Embassy in El Salvador as an official mental health provider and is the founding president and member of the Board of Directors of the "Tin Marín" children's museum in El Salvador.

Guttfreund served as president of the Association of Barra de Santiago, a protected beach of El Salvador. He was very active in Barra de Santiago's two main schools, two health centers and promoting environmental issues at the Barra de Santiago beach.

He created a post-graduate clinical training seminar for graduating students at FUNPRES, a private nonprofit foundation for the improvement of education in El Salvador. He also served as a member of the board of directors of the American School, as chairman of the Education Committee.

Guttfreund speaks Spanish, English, Hebrew and Portuguese.

Published works
Over the course of his career, Dr. Guttfreund has collaborated with renowned professionals in diverse fields. The following is a short selection of published works with contributions by him.
 Selles, R. R., Nelson, R., Zepeda, R., Dane, B. F., Wu, M. S., Novoa, J. C., Guttfreund, D., & Storch, E. A. (2015). Body Focused Repetitive Behaviors Among Salvadorean Youth: Incidence and Clinical Correlates. Journal of Obsessive-Compulsive and Related Disorders, 5, 49-54.
 Selles, R. R., Zepeda, R., Dane, B. F., Novoa, J. C., Guttfreund, D., Nelson, R., & Storch, E. A. (2015). Parental perceptions of mental health care for children in El Salvador. Journal of Child and Family Studies, 24, 3396-3401.
 Wu, M.S., Selles, R., Novoa, J.C., Zepeda, R., Guttfreund, D., McBride, N., & Storch, E.A. (2017). Examination of the Phenomenology and Clinical Correlates of Emetophobia in a Sample of Salvadorean Youths. Child Psychiatry and Human Development, 48, 509-516.

References

External links
 
 Character of the month in Medio Lleno
 Board Game developed by Daniel Guttfreund

1962 births
Living people
Salvadoran psychologists